Nancheng is a county of eastern Jiangxi province, People's Republic of China. It is under the jurisdiction of the prefecture-level city of Fuzhou. Historically it has been known as Jianchangfu (Kienchang).

Administrative divisions
In the present, Nancheng County has 9 towns and 3 townships.
9 towns

3 townships
 Xujia
 Tianjingyuan
 Xunxi

Demographics 

Climate 
Nancheng County has a humid subtropical climate (Köppen Cfa), with long, humid, very hot summers and cool and drier winters with occasional cold snaps. After the heavy rains subside in June, summer is especially sunny. Autumn is warm to mild and relatively dry. With monthly percent possible sunshine ranging from 20% in March to 58% in July, the county receives 1,635 hours of bright sunshine annually.

Transportation
 Xiangtang–Putian Railway

Notes and references

External links 
  Government site - 
  Video of Nancheng

County-level divisions of Jiangxi
Fuzhou, Jiangxi